Valeriy Vasilevich Kopayev; (15 July 1954 – 29 June 1979) was a Soviet nordic combined skier who competed in the 1970s. He finished seventh in the Nordic combined event at the 1976 Winter Olympics in Innsbruck.

References
1976 nordic combined results
Information on Kapaev's death. 
Olympic nordic combined results: 1968-84
Wallechinsky, David (1984). "Nordic Combined". In The Complete Book of the Olympics: 1896-1980. New York: Penguin Books. p. 624.
Valeriy Kapaev's profile at Sports Reference.com
Biography of Valeriy Kapaev 

1954 births
1979 deaths
Nordic combined skiers at the 1976 Winter Olympics
Olympic Nordic combined skiers of the Soviet Union
Russian male Nordic combined skiers
Soviet male Nordic combined skiers